Jack Redshaw (born 20 November 1990) is an English professional footballer who plays as a forward for Hyde United.

Career

Rochdale
Redshaw was then in talks with Blackpool, but signed for Rochdale a few weeks later and was given the number 10 shirt. He made his debut as a late substitute for Rochdale on 14 August 2010 in the Football League One game against Brighton & Hove Albion at The Withdean Stadium.

Altrincham
Redshaw signed for Altrincham on 13 October 2011. He made his debut as a substitute against Vauxhall Motors. He scored twice for Altrincham in a friendly against a Manchester United XI. He also scored in a Cheshire cup game before returning briefly to former club Salford City for a Manchester Premier Cup game, in which he scored a hat-trick. On his return to Altrincham he scored in an FA Trophy defeat against FC United of Manchester before scoring his first league goals in a 4–2 victory over F.C. Halifax Town.

Morecambe
On 24 January 2012, he signed for Morecambe.

In August 2014 Morecambe accepted a bid for Redshaw from League One side Peterborough United but after having a medical and discussing personal terms Redshaw rejected the move.

Blackpool
He signed for Blackpool in 2015, spending two seasons with the club before being released in May 2017.

Salford City (second spell)
In July 2017 he returned to Salford City, signing a two-year contract. In June 2019 he was released by the club after the expiry of his contract.

FC Halifax Town
In November 2019 he signed for FC Halifax Town.

York City
On 12 August 2020, Redshaw signed for York City.

Ashton United
In the summer of 2021, Redshaw signed for Northern Premier League Premier Division side Ashton United on a free transfer.

Chester (loan)
On 24 September 2021, Redshaw joined National League North side Chester on an initial three-month loan deal. On 3 January, Redshaw returned to Ashton having scored two goals in thirteen appearances.

Hyde United 
On 20th June 2022, Redshaw joined Hyde United from Ashton United

Career statistics

References

External links
 

Living people
Association football forwards
English footballers
Manchester City F.C. players
Rochdale A.F.C. players
Salford City F.C. players
Altrincham F.C. players
Morecambe F.C. players
Blackpool F.C. players
FC Halifax Town players
York City F.C. players
Ashton United F.C. players
Chester F.C. players
English Football League players
National League (English football) players
Northern Premier League players
1990 births